Watling Temple is the name given to the temple within a Roman town next to the modern A2 road in Newington, near Sittingbourne in Kent, England.

The town was rediscovered in 2019 during an archaeological dig covering 18 acres that found iron furnaces and pottery kilns as part of a manufacturing site, a Roman temple, a seven metre wide Roman road and late Iron Age remains dating from 30BC.

The Roman road Watling Street runs through the village of Newington, and the newly discovered road predates it and takes an alternative route.

A reconstruction of the temple foundations was officially unveiled in September 2021 as the result of a collaboration between Newington History Group, SWAT Archaeology and Persimmon Homes South East. The reconstruction is the same size and orientation as the original and is located only 70 metres away from where it was uncovered. A footpath reflects the alignment of the seven metre wide Roman road to the temple. 

It is on permanent, free display in a landscaped area off Watling Drive, Newington, ME9 7FX.

The excavation has been built on by Persimmon homes, with 124 homes in a development called "Watling Place".

References 

Roman towns and cities in England
Ancient Roman temples
Archaeological sites in Kent